Gerald Leo Leahy (born October 15, 1934) is a former American football linebacker who played college football for Colorado and professional football in the National Football League (NFL) for the Pittsburgh Steelers in 1957.

Early years
Leahy was born in 1934 in Bay City, Michigan, and attended North St. Joseph's High School. He played college football as an end and linebacker for the Colorado Buffaloes from 1954 to 1956. He was a member of the 1956 Colorado Buffaloes football team that won the 1957 Orange Bowl. He was a "near unanimous choice" for the 1956 All-Big Seven Conference football team.

Professional football
Leahy was drafted by the Detroit Lions in the seventh round (83rd overall pick) of the 1957 NFL Draft. When Buddy Parker left the Lions to become coach of the Pittsburgh Steelers in 1957, he signed Leahy to come with him to Pittsburgh. Leahy appeared in one game for the Steelers in 1957. He was signed again by the Steelers in May 1958. He was dropped by the Steelers at the end of August 1958.

References

1934 births
Living people
American football linebackers
Pittsburgh Steelers players
Colorado Buffaloes football players
Sportspeople from Bay City, Michigan
Players of American football from Michigan